Ayala  may refer to:

Places
 Ciudad Ayala, Morelos, Mexico
 Ayala Alabang, a barangay in Muntinlupa, Philippines
 Ayala Avenue, a major thoroughfare in the Makati Central Business District, Philippines
 Ayala, Magalang, a barrio in Magalang, Pampanga, Philippines 
 Ayala, Zamboanga, a barrio in Zamboanga City, Philippines
 Ayala/Aiara, a town in Álava province, Spain

People
 Ayala (given name)
 Ayala (surname), a surname of Basque origin
 Ayala (musician), musician, singer, songwriter and TV presenter of The Ayala Show

Arts and entertainment
 Yowlah (also called "ayala"), a traditional dance of the United Arab Emirates and Oman
 "Ayala", a song from the album 17 by XXXTentacion
 Ayala (Star Trek), a fictional character on Star Trek: Voyager
 Ayala Dormer, a fictional character in Anthony Trollope's novel Ayala's Angel

Other uses
 Ayala Corporation, a holding company operating in the Philippines
 Ayala Center, a commercial development at Makati, Philippines
 Ayala & Co., a champagne producer
 Ayala (horse), a racehorse that won the 1963 Grand National
 Ruben S. Ayala High School, California, USA

See also
 Ein Ayala, a semi-cooperative moshav in northern Israel